Robinsonia morula is a moth in the family Erebidae. It was described by Herbert Druce in 1906. It is found in French Guiana, Amazonas and Peru.

References

Moths described in 1906
Robinsonia (moth)
Arctiinae of South America